Tianbao station may refer to:

 Tianbao station (Dongguan Rail Transit)
 Tianbao station (Nanjing Metro)